RMS Carinthia was first laid down in Barrow-in-Furness in 1924 with the yard number Hull 586. Originally she had the name Servia but was renamed at the time of her launching on 24 February 1925. She made her maiden voyage on 22 August 1925 from Liverpool to New York City. At her launch she was the largest of the five post First World War intermediate size liners.

Features
RMS Carinthia was noted for her comfortable accommodation in 3rd class. The dining room provided small tables for travelling parties of family and friends, an innovation at the time. There was also a smoking room and small library and a shop for the third class passengers needs. The first class restaurant was called the Adams room and had silver lamps on each table. The ship was also well equipped for sport with an arena that covered  over two decks and included a swimming pool, gymnasium, racket courts and shower and bath rooms for massage treatments. On the "A" deck there was the 1st class smoke room which had been modelled after the house of El Greco, the Spanish painter, the room also contained an American bar. The first class lounge was furnished and decorated to represent the period of King William of Orange.

Service

The Carinthia plied  the Atlantic on the Liverpool-Boston-New York route. She was also used for cruising. In 1931 her passenger accommodation was altered. Instead of 1st, 2nd, and 3rd Classes, she now had Cabin Class, Tourist Class and 3rd Class.  During 1933 she made a world cruise calling at 40 ports including Tristan da Cunha, (known as the remotest island on the planet) covering . In 1933 RMS Carinthia received an SOS from the Latvian steamer Andromeda which had struck an unknown submerged object. The incident had happened eighty miles from Ushant in the English Channel but Carinthia had been too far away to make a rescue and the ship sank. The crew of the steamer were rescued by the steamship Hartside.

In 1934, she was transferred to the London–Le Havre–Southampton–New York route. From 1935 until 1939 she was reverted to New York and used for Winter cruising. Her hull was painted white with a green boot-topping for the cruising duties. On 20 September 1938, the Carinthia was on a cruise from New York to the Caribbean, 150 miles north of Florida when she was warned of bad weather ahead, the infamous 1938 hurricane.  She turned to avoid the storm, but the storm also turned and she sailed right into it. Despite category 5 winds and huge seas, she survived the storm with only cosmetic damage and sick passengers.

In August 1939, she was converted into an armed merchant cruiser, retaining the name Carinthia. She was accepted into service on 30 December 1939. The badly damaged ship remained afloat for 36 hours before she sank during the evening of 7 June. Four people died during the sinking — two crew members and two ratings.

Wreck
The wreck lies at the position at a depth of 384 ft - 117m, 30 miles east of Bloody Foreland.

Citations

Bibliography

External links

 

1925 ships
Steamships of the United Kingdom
Passenger ships of the United Kingdom
Ships of the Cunard Line
Ships built in Barrow-in-Furness
World War II Auxiliary cruisers of the Royal Navy
Ships sunk by German submarines in World War II
World War II shipwrecks in the Atlantic Ocean
Maritime incidents in June 1940
Shipwrecks of Ireland
Maritime incidents in Ireland